Linking rings may refer to:

 Chinese linking rings, a classic magical illusion
 The Linking Ring, the monthly magazine of the International Brotherhood of Magicians